Ellen Alma Rose  (27 April 1907 – 17 July 1996) was a notable New Zealand clerk, nurse, nursing administrator and hospital matron. She was born in Riverton, New Zealand, in 1907.

In the 1958 Queen's Birthday Honours, Rose was appointed a Member of the Order of the British Empire.

References

1907 births
1996 deaths
New Zealand public servants
New Zealand nurses
People from Riverton, New Zealand
People educated at Southland Girls' High School
New Zealand Members of the Order of the British Empire
New Zealand women nurses